Manuel Hagel (born 1 May 1988) is a German banker and politician of the Christian Democratic Union (CDU) who has been serving as a member of the State Parliament of Baden-Württemberg since 2016, where has been chairing his party's parliamentary group since 2021. From 2016 to 2021, he was the secretary general of his party in Baden-Württemberg, under the leadership of its chairman Thomas Strobl.

Early life and career 
Hagel was born 1988 in the Swabian town of Ehingen and became a banker.

Political career 
Hagel entered the CDU in 2006 and was elected as part of his party's leadership in Baden-Württemberg in 2015. He became a member of the Landtag of Baden-Württemberg in the 2016 state elections. In parliament, he has since been serving on the Committee on Internal Affairs, Digitization and Migration and on the Committee on Consumer Protection.

On the basis of a proposal made by Thomas Strobl, Hagel was elected as secretary general of the CDU in Baden-Württemberg in 2016.

Hagel was nominated by his party as delegate to the Federal Convention for the purpose of electing the President of Germany in 2022.

Political positions 
In 2020, Hagel expressed support for Jens Spahn as next chairman of the CDU. Ahead of the 2021 Christian Democratic Union of Germany leadership election, he endorsed Friedrich Merz to succeed Annegret Kramp-Karrenbauer as the party’s chair.

References 

Living people
1988 births
21st-century German politicians